Estonia competed at the 2011 World Aquatics Championships in Shanghai, China between July 16 and 31, 2011.

Swimming

Estonia qualified 6 swimmers.

Men

Women

 * qualified due to the withdrawal of another swimmer

References

Nations at the 2011 World Aquatics Championships
2011 in Estonian sport
Estonia at the World Aquatics Championships